John Samuels Caskie (November 8, 1821 – December 16, 1869) was a nineteenth-century congressman, lawyer and judge from Virginia.

Biography
Born in Richmond, Virginia, Caskie graduated from the University of Virginia in 1842, studied law and was admitted to the bar in around 1842, commencing practice in Richmond. He was the prosecuting attorney of Richmond from 1842 to 1846 and judge of the Richmond and Henrico circuits from 1846 to 1849.

Caskie was elected a Democrat to the United States House of Representatives in 1850, serving from 1851 to 1859. After being unsuccessful for reelection in 1858, he resumed practicing law until his death in Richmond, Virginia on December 16, 1869. He was interred there in Hollywood Cemetery.

Elections

1851; Caskie was elected to the U.S. House of Representatives with 54.49% of the vote, defeating Whig John Minor Botts.
1853; Caskie was re-elected with 54.89% of the vote, defeating Whig Clayton G. Coleman.
1855; Caskie was re-elected with 52.12% of the vote, defeating American William C. Scott.
1857; Caskie was re-elected 63.72% of the vote, defeating American A. Judson Crane.
1859; Caskie was defeated for re-election.

External links

1821 births
1869 deaths
Politicians from Richmond, Virginia
Virginia lawyers
University of Virginia alumni
Burials at Hollywood Cemetery (Richmond, Virginia)
19th-century American politicians
19th-century American lawyers
Democratic Party members of the United States House of Representatives from Virginia
19th-century American judges
Lawyers from Richmond, Virginia
Virginia circuit court judges